Radioflash is a 2019 American thriller drama film directed by Ben McPherson, starring Brighton Sharbino, Dominic Monaghan, Will Patton, Fionnula Flanagan and Miles Anderson.

Cast
 Brighton Sharbino as Reese
 Dominic Monaghan as Chris
 Will Patton as Frank
 Fionnula Flanagan as Maw
 Miles Anderson as Farmer Glenn
 Michael Filipowich as Bill
 Kyle Collin as Quinn
In addition, YouTuber SypherPK cameos in a livestream Reese watches.

Release
The film was released on 15 November 2019.

Reception
John Defore of The Hollywood Reporter wrote, "If the dangers tilt toward the lurid, though, the film never quite loses sight of its endpoint or gives in to the horrors it threatens. Unsatisfyingly, it instead concludes with a tech-flavored shot that might hint at greater ambitions for what seems like a stand-alone adventure." Dennis Harvey of Variety called the film "an offbeat conceptual mixture, albeit one that’s somewhat frustrating and occasionally tedious, if beautifully photographed by Austin Schmidt."

Noel Murray of the Los Angeles Times wrote that "given how visually inventive and unusual the film’s first five minutes are, it’s disappointing that, by its last half hour, it essentially turns into one undistinguished chase scene after another." Jeannette Catsoulis of The New York Times wrote that the film "is only marginally more thrilling than the average wine tasting."

References

External links
 
 

American thriller drama films
2019 thriller drama films